"Parda Hai Parda" (Hindi: पर्दा है पर्दा, Urdu: پردہ ہے پردہ) is a filmi qawwali song from the Bollywood 1977 film, Amar Akbar Anthony.  It was performed by playback singers Mohammed Rafi and Amit Kumar and the lyrics were penned by Anand Bakshi; the film's musical directors were the duo Laxmikant-Pyarelal. It provides a comic commentary on how women's beautiful faces are hidden by their veils. It appears in the film as a sequence where Rishi Kapoor's character, Akbar, performs in a Qawwali show to impress his love interest, Dr. Salma (played by Neetu Singh). When Dr. Salma attempts to open her veil, her father, Tayyab Ali (played by Mukri), tries to stop her but fails. The sequence also features the character of Anthony Gonsalves (Amitabh Bachchan) and an old woman who is later revealed to be their mother, Bharati (Nirupa Roy).

Parda Hai Parda gained much popularity with South Asian audiences and ranked second in the Binaca Geetmala year-end chart for 1977.

Laxmikant-Pyarelal were awarded the Filmfare Best Music Director Award for 1977 on the strength of Amar Akbar Anthony's soundtrack, and particularly this song. Mohammed Rafi was nominated as the best playback singer that year for the same song.

See also
My Name Is Anthony Gonsalves (song)

References

1977 songs
Indian songs
Hindi film songs
Qawwali songs
Mohammed Rafi songs
Songs with music by Laxmikant–Pyarelal
Songs with lyrics by Anand Bakshi